For the game, see Lexicant, a variant of ghost (game).

In a supersymmetric quantum field theory, a superghost is a fermionic Faddeev–Popov ghost, which is used in the gauge fixing of a fermionic symmetry generator.

Supersymmetric quantum field theory
String theory